Athlone GAA is the Gaelic football club in the town of Athlone in County Westmeath, Republic of Ireland. The local hurling club is called Southern Gaels.

Athlone is Westmeath GAA's most successful football club.

Club history
The club was founded in 1885 by Irish National League members, bringing GAA to Athlone. 

Athlone GAA are Westmeath's most successful club with 20 senior titles, the last of which was 1998. They achieved an unprecedented six-in-a-row between 1955 and 1960.  

2018 represents their 7th time to qualify for Feile Peil na nOg, winning Div 2.

The club is home to Westmeath's first footballing All-Star, Rory O'Connell. 

In 2017, the club bridged a 24-year gap by winning the County Minor Championship.

Irish rugby international Robbie Henshaw played senior and underage football for Athlone. 

Athlone won the inaugural U20 Football championship in 2018, beating Castleday/Rosemount in the final.

John Deacy, a defender on the 1965 Westmeath Senior Championship winning team, received his medal after a 55-year delay in October 2020.

Club infrastructure
The club caters for both football and hurling with the hurlers playing under the Southern Gaels banner. The club have three full size floodlit pitches, the 3rd pitch is dedicated to the memory of former player and coach, David Allen. The Athlone GAA also has its own bar and ballroom and is used by various local groups (Tae Kwon Do, Irish traditional music, Line Dancing, ...).

Notable players
 Noel Mulligan
 Alan Gaughan
 John Egan
 Ray Connellan
 Matt Scally
 Rory O'Connell
 Fergal Murray
 Aidan Collins
 Robbie Henshaw
 John Connellan
 James Finlass
 Paul Mullan

Notable managers
Liam McHale

Club honours
 Westmeath Senior Football Championships (20)
 1905, 1929 (Army) 1947, 1949, 1955, 1956, 1957, 1958, 1959, 1960, 1965, 1971, 1973, 1977, 1979, 1982, 1984, 1988, 1991, 1998.
 Westmeath Intermediate Football Championships (1)
 2015
 Leinster Intermediate Club Football Championship
 Runners-Up 2015
 Westmeath Junior Football Championships (8)
 1916, 1921, 1945, 1954, 1969, 1975, 1976, 1977.
 Westmeath Under 21 Football Championships (11)
 1963, 1971, 1980, 1981, 1982, 1983, 1986, 1988, 1996, 2005, 2013
 Westmeath Under 20 Football Championships (1)
 2018
 Westmeath Minor Football Championships (12)
 1949, 1950, 1952, 1954, 1969, 1978, 1979, 1981, 1984, 1986, 1993, 2017.
 Westmeath Under-17 Football Championships (5)
 1963, 1977, 1978, 1979, 1980.
Westmeath Under-16 Football Championships (10)
 1967, 1968, 1970, 1973, 1976, 1980, 1983, 1984, 1985, 1991.
 Westmeath Under-14 Football Championships (10)
 1946, 1947, 1966, 1969, 1974, 1975, 1978, 1981, 1989, 2011.
 Westmeath Under-12 Football Championships (5)
 1980, 1981, 1999, 2000, 2002.
 Feis Cup Senior Football (10)
 1956, 1957, 1960, 1967, 1970, 1971, 1972, 1974, 1977, 1993.
 Westmeath Senior 'B' Football Championships (1)
 1985
 Féile na nÓg
 1985 (Cork) 1997, 1998, 2010, 2011, 2014, 2018 (Div 2)
 Ladies Under-12 Football Championship (1)
 1999

Proposed US tour and legal dispute 
Following Athlone GAA's winning of the Westmeath County Championship in 1984, it was decided to send the team to the United States in 1985. More than £11,000 was collected quickly and put on a bank account set up for the occasion. A dispute over control of the trip's finances between executive committee members and the tour committee led to a lengthy legal dispute. In 1994, the case went to the Supreme Court of Ireland and was still ongoing in 2001.

References

External links
Official Athlone GAA Club website

Gaelic games clubs in County Westmeath
Sport in Athlone